Serpin B8 is a protein that in humans is encoded by the SERPINB8 gene.

See also
 Serpin

References

Further reading

External links
 The MEROPS online database for peptidases and their inhibitors: I04.013
 

Serine protease inhibitors